The Chiesa di San Salvatore (of the Holy Savior) is a church in Venice, northern Italy. Known in Venetian as San Salvador, is located on the Campo San Salvador, along the Merceria, the main shopping street of Venice. The church was first consecrated in 1177 by Pope Alexander III shortly after his reconciliation with Emperor Frederick Barbarossa at nearby San Marco. The present church, however, was begun in around 1508 by Giorgio Spavento and continued after his death the following year by Tullio Lombardo, Vincenzo Scamozzi and possibly Jacopo Sansovino. They built a large hall church, formed from three Greek crosses placed end to end. Each has a dome with a lantern to let light into the cavernous interior. The facade was added in 1663 by Giuseppe Sardi.

Adjoining the church is the former monastery, now the offices of the telephone company, which still contain Sansovino's magnificent cloisters.

San Salvador is the parish church of a parish in the Vicariate of San Marco-Castello. Other churches in the parish are San Bartolomeo and San Zulian.

San Salvador is a small, but still-active religious, cultural and social centre.

Below the left column on the facade there is a cannonball embedded in the base of the column. It derived from a bombardment in 1849 by Austrian forces in the port of Marghera, of the independent republic which had been proclaimed by Daniele Manin.

Works of art
 Jacopo Sansovino (tomb of Francesco Venier on the south wall).
 Titian (Annunciation on the south wall and Transfiguration, the altarpiece of the high altar).
 Francesco Vecellio (paintings on organ doors; frescoes in tomb in floor in front of high altar).
 Alessandro Vittoria (altar on north wall, with statues of St. Roch and St. Sebastian).
 Giulio Angolo del Moro Savior in Monument of Andrea Dolfin.

Funerary monuments
 Caterina Cornaro (d.1510) (Queen of Cyprus).
 Andrea Dolfin
 Doge Gerolamo Priuli
 Doge Lorenzo Priuli
 Doge Francesco Venier (d.1556).

See also
 History of early modern period domes

External links

 Satellite image from Google Maps
 Church of San Salvador

Buildings and structures completed in 1177
1177 establishments in Europe
12th-century establishments in the Republic of Venice
Salvador
17th-century Roman Catholic church buildings in Italy